B-Boy Stance may refer to:

a single by k-os, from the 2004 album Joyful Rebellion,
a single by Cassidy, from the 2005 album I'm a Hustla.